The Horsemasters was a 2 part episode of the Disneyland TV show from 1961 which screened theatrically in some countries.

The film was one of several Disney films that were shot in England. It was Annette Funicello's first co-starring role in a feature film. The film included a song written by the Sherman Brothers, the first song which the duo ever wrote for a Disney project. The film received a comic book adaptation in the Four Color series by Dell Comics.

Plot
A group of young people do a course in horsemanship in England.

Cast
Annette Funicello as Dinah Wilcox
Tommy Kirk as Danny Grant
Janet Munro as Janet Hale
Tony Britton as Major George Brooke
John Fraser as David Lawford
Donald Pleasence as Captain Pinski
Harry Lockart as Vincenzo Lalli
Colin Gordon as Mr. Ffolliott
Anthony Nicholls as Hardy Cole
Jean Marsh as Andrienne
Lisa Madron as Ingrid
Penelope Horner as Penny
Millicent Martin as Joan

Production
It was based on a 1957 novel by Don Stanford. Film rights were bought by Walt Disney, who authorised a television film version to be shot in England. Disney made a number of films in England around this time, including Greyfriars Bobby. In August 1960 Annette Funicello and Tommy Kirk were cast. It was Funicello's first co-starring role in a feature.

The musical number, "Strummin' Song", performed by Annette Funicello and written by the Sherman Brothers marked the first song the Sherman Brothers ever wrote for a Disney project.

The film was shot on location in England. Filming started September 1960. Funicello and Kirk were sent to England several weeks before filming started to practise their riding.

Funicello says during filming married members of crew would have affairs with the cast, and at times the director "would refer to me dismissively as 'the Disney girl' and make unflattering comments about me. Of course he was not the first and would not be the last to take a dislike to me because he felt I was Mr Disney's 'pet'."

Comic book adaptation
 Dell Four Color #1260 (December 1961-February 1962)

References

External links

Review of 1957 novel at Kirkus

1961 television films
1961 films
Disney television films
Films about horses
Films set in England
Films shot in England
Sherman Brothers
Films adapted into comics
Films with screenplays by Ted Willis, Baron Willis
Films based on novels
1960s English-language films
Films directed by William Fairchild